Forest Hill was an electoral district of the Legislative Assembly in the Australian state of Victoria. It was a 25 km² electorate located in the eastern suburbs of Melbourne, encompassing the suburbs of Blackburn South, Burwood East and Vermont South and parts of Forest Hill and Vermont. The electorate had a population of 50,163 as of the 2006 census.

Forest Hill was created as a relatively safe Liberal seat in 1976, and was won by Liberal candidate John Richardson at the election that year. Richardson was re-elected at six consecutive elections, surviving some close races against Labor candidates at the height of the Cain government in the 1980s, and held the seat with a comfortable margin of over 7% when he retired at the 2002 election. However, Labor nominated high-profile skier and Winter Olympics medallist Kirstie Marshall as their candidate at that election, which combined with a statewide Labor landslide and the loss of Richardson's personal vote saw Labor easily win the seat for the first time. Marshall suffered a sharp swing back to the Liberal Party at the 2006 election, and held the seat by a margin of only 0.78%. At the 2010 election, Marshall was defeated by Liberal candidate Neil Angus.

The seat was abolished by the Electoral Boundaries Commission ahead of the 2022 election and largely replaced by the electoral district of Glen Waverley.

Members for Forest Hill

Election results

References

External links
 Electorate profile: Forest Hill District, Victorian Electoral Commission

1976 establishments in Australia
Former electoral districts of Victoria (Australia)
2022 disestablishments in Australia